Westside, California may refer to:

 Westside (Los Angeles County)
 Westside, Fresno County, California
 Westside, Long Beach, California, a neighborhood